The Battle of Lacolle was fought on November 7, 1838, between Loyal Lower Canada volunteer forces under Major John Scriver and Patriote rebels under Colonel Ferdinand-Alphonse Oklowski. On November 6, on their way to Lacolle, the Patriote rebels had won a first skirmish, but they lost in the final confrontation the next day. The battle lasted half an hour.

References 

"Bataille de Lacolle - 6 et 7 novembre 1838. (Bataille)" in La Mémoire du Québec

Lacolle 1838
Lacolle, Battle of
Lacolle
1838 in Lower Canada
November 1838 events